"Muscle Energy of the Ribs" is an Osteopathic Manipulative Medicine technique used to treat dysfunctional ribs.

When treating each rib with muscle energy, assistance with local muscles is elicited as follows:

References 

Osteopathic techniques